The Tabasco mud turtle (Kinosternon acutum), commonly known as pochitoque in Tabasco, Mexico, is a small turtle which belongs to the family Kinosternidae. It can be found in central Veracruz, Tabasco, northern Guatemala and Belize. This turtle lives in small streams, marshes and ponds. Its feeding habits are mainly carnivorous and it is a nocturnal animal. Although this turtle doesn't have a wide range it can be common at some sites. In Tabasco this turtle is an important part of its popular culture as well as being an ingredient in Tabasco's gastronomy in spite of its special protected status.

Pochitoque in Tabasco's culture 

In this south Mexican state this turtle has a significant importance. Since ancient time Chontales have used it as an ingredient in their traditional kitchen so next to other turtle species (jicotea and mojina), pochitoque has a huge demand among people of these Chontal communities as well as in restaurants of typical food. Pochitoque is roasted and then is eaten as a green soup with rice, this is called "pochitoque en verde".

The pochitoque is a main character in some Chontal legends. Among Chontal people, it is said that if a crocodile eats a pochitoque, this turtle eats the crocodile from the inside and survives by killing the crocodile.

Due to its protagonism in these stories, some poets and singers from Tabasco use pochitoque as an inspiration for their poems and songs and there is a dance of pochitoque as well. The song "Pochitoque Jahuactero" sang by a popular singer from Tabasco, talks about a pochitoque that needs to be careful when going out of his swamp.

Special protected status 

This turtle is vulnerable because it is eaten by locals and because of its limited range. Hunting and eating this turtle is prohibited but poaching continues. Pochitoque even has been identified in international traffic. In 2012, a Russian citizen was surprised with 322 pochitoques in his case. According to Norma Oficial Mexicana (NOM059 ECOL 2001), this species has a special protected status. Different organizations operate in order to protect this species as well as help them in the process of its conservation. Communities in some states in Mexico dedicate their efforts to creating hatcheries to maintain and increase the species' numbers.

Notes

References
 Tortoise & Freshwater Turtle Specialist Group 1996.  Kinosternon acutum. 2006 IUCN Red List of Threatened Species. Retrieved 29 July 2007.

Kinosternon
Turtles of North America
Reptiles of Mexico
Reptiles of Belize
Reptiles of Guatemala
Fauna of Southern Mexico
Fauna of the Yucatán Peninsula
Natural history of Tabasco
Natural history of Yucatán
Near threatened fauna of North America
Near threatened biota of Mexico
Reptiles described in 1831
Taxa named by John Edward Gray
Taxonomy articles created by Polbot
Petén–Veracruz moist forests